Peter Hess Beckwith (September 8, 1939 – October 4, 2019) was an American Anglican bishop.

Beckwith graduated from Hillsdale College in 1961 and was a member of the Delta Tau Delta fraternity. He served as College Chaplain from 2010 to 2016, and as Chaplain Emeritus of Hillsdale College. Prior to that as bishop of the Anglican Church in North America and as a naval chaplain, rising to the rank of Rear Admiral in the reserves.

Beckwith was the tenth bishop of the Episcopal Diocese of Springfield, serving from 1992 to 2010. A theological conservative, he left the Episcopal Church afterwards. He was received as a member of the House of Bishops of the Anglican Church in North America at their College of the Bishops meeting, at 10 October 2014, in Atlanta, Georgia. He served since then as assisting bishop of the Anglican Diocese of the Great Lakes.

He died on October 4, 2019, and leaves his wife Melinda and his sons Peter, Jr. and Michael.

References

External links 
Abraham Lincoln Presidential Library interview

1939 births
2019 deaths
Bishops of the Anglican Church in North America
20th-century American Episcopalians
Episcopal bishops of Springfield
21st-century American clergy
Anglican realignment people